Howell Cobb (December 7, 1922 – September 16, 2005) was a Texas lawyer and United States district judge of the United States District Court for the Eastern District of Texas.

Education and career

Born in Atlanta, Georgia, Cobb joined the United States Navy in 1942, completing his cadet training in 1943 and serving as a lieutenant in the United States Marine Corps from 1943 to 1945, during which time he was a fighter pilot in the Pacific Theater. He finished his service as an instructor at Pensacola Naval Air Station in 1945. He then returned to school, receiving a Bachelor of Laws from the University of Virginia School of Law in 1948. He went into private practice, first in Houston, Texas, from 1949 to 1954, and then in Beaumont, Texas, from 1954 to 1985.

Federal judicial service

On February 26, 1985, President Ronald Reagan nominated Cobb to a new seat on the United States District Court for the Eastern District of Texas, created by 98 Stat. 333. Cobb was confirmed by the United States Senate on April 3, 1985, and received his commission the following day. He assumed senior status on March 1, 2001, and continued serving in that capacity until his death of a heart attack, during a family vacation in Castine, Maine.

Personal

Cobb and his wife, Amelie, had six children. Cobb was the great grandson of the former governor of Georgia and Civil War figure Howell Cobb.

References

Sources
 "Visiting federal judge dies in Castine Sept. 16", Bangor Daily News (Maine) (September 19, 2005), B3.
 

1922 births
2005 deaths
United States Marine Corps pilots of World War II
Judges of the United States District Court for the Eastern District of Texas
United States district court judges appointed by Ronald Reagan
20th-century American judges
United States Marines
University of Virginia School of Law alumni
People from Atlanta
People from Beaumont, Texas
United States Marine Corps officers
United States Navy personnel of World War II